Donald Eugene Bradey (born October 4, 1934) is an American former professional baseball player.

Bradey had just completed his 12th season in the minor leagues when Houston called him up during September 1964. His first two MLB games were as a relief pitcher, and Bradey surrendered unearned runs in each game. Then, on October 4, 1964, the closing day of the 1964 season (and Bradey's 30th birthday), he started against the Los Angeles Dodgers. He faced only eight batters, recording two outs but giving up four hits, two bases on balls, a wild pitch, two stolen bases and five earned runs.

In the minor leagues, Bradey appeared in 616 games and posted a 127–118 win–loss record. He won 19 games for the 1959 New Orleans Pelicans of the Class AA Southern Association.

References

External links

1934 births
Living people
Amarillo Sonics players
Baseball players from North Carolina
Charlotte Hornets (baseball) players
Colorado Springs Sky Sox (WL) players
Houston Colt .45s players
Little Rock Travelers players
Major League Baseball pitchers
Memphis Chickasaws players
New Orleans Pelicans (baseball) players
Oklahoma City 89ers players
San Antonio Bullets players
Syracuse Chiefs players
Waterloo White Hawks players